Johnnie Lee Cochran Jr. (October 2, 1937 – March 29, 2005) was an American attorney best known for his leadership role in the defense and criminal acquittal of O.J. Simpson for the murder of his ex-wife Nicole Brown Simpson and her friend Ron Goldman. He often defended his client with rhymes like, "If it doesn't fit, you must acquit!"

Cochran represented Sean Combs, Michael Jackson, Tupac Shakur, Stanley Tookie Williams, Todd Bridges, football player Jim Brown, Snoop Dogg, former heavyweight champion Riddick Bowe, 1992 Los Angeles riot beating victim Reginald Oliver Denny, and inmate and activist Geronimo Pratt. He represented athlete Marion Jones when she faced charges of doping during her high school track career. Cochran was known for his skill in the courtroom and his prominence as an early advocate for victims of police brutality.

Early life 
Cochran was born in 1937 in Shreveport, Louisiana. His father, Johnnie Cochran Sr. (October 20, 1916 – April 29, 2018), was an insurance salesman and his mother sold Avon products. The family relocated to the West Coast during the second wave of the Great Migration, settling in Los Angeles in 1949. Cochran went to local schools and graduated first in his class from Los Angeles High School in 1955. He earned a Bachelor of Arts degree in business economics from the University of California, Los Angeles in 1959 and a Juris Doctor from the Loyola Law School in 1962. He was a member of Kappa Alpha Psi Fraternity, initiated through the Upsilon Chapter and the fraternity's 45th Laurel Wreath laureate.

Legal practice 

Inspired by Thurgood Marshall and the legal victory that Marshall won in Brown v. Board of Education, Cochran decided to dedicate his life to practicing law. Cochran felt his career was a calling, a double opportunity to work for what he considered to be right and to challenge what he considered wrong; he could make a difference by practicing law. In A Lawyer's Life, Cochran wrote, "I read everything that I could find about Thurgood Marshall and confirmed that a single dedicated man could use the law to change society".

Despite setbacks as a lawyer, Cochran vowed not to cease what he was doing, saying: "I made this commitment and I must fulfill it."

Early career 

After passing the California bar exam in 1963, Cochran took a position in Los Angeles as a deputy city attorney in the criminal division.  In 1964, the young Cochran prosecuted one of his first celebrity cases, Lenny Bruce, a comedian who had recently been arrested on obscenity charges. Two years later, Cochran entered private practice. Soon thereafter, he opened his own firm, Cochran, Atkins & Evans, in Los Angeles.

In his first notable case, Cochran represented an African-American widow who sued several police officers who had shot and killed her husband, Leonard Deadwyler. Though Cochran lost the case, it became a turning point in his career. Rather than seeing the case as a defeat, Cochran realized the trial itself had awakened the black community. In reference to the loss, Cochran wrote in The American Lawyer, "those were extremely difficult cases to win in those days. But what Deadwyler confirmed for me was that this issue of police abuse really galvanized the minority community. It taught me that these cases could really get attention."

By the late 1970s, Cochran had established his reputation in the black community. He was litigating a number of high-profile police brutality and criminal cases.

Los Angeles County District Attorney's office 
In 1978, Cochran returned to the Los Angeles County District Attorney's office in the leadership position of First Assistant District Attorney. Though he took a pay cut to do so, joining the government was his way of becoming "one of the good guys, one of the very top rung." He began to strengthen his ties with the political community, alter his image, and work from within to change the system.

Return to private practice 

Five years later, Cochran returned to private practice, reinventing himself as "the best in the West" by opening the Johnnie L Cochran Jr. law firm. In contrast to his early loss in the Deadwyler case, Cochran won 760,000 for the family of Ron Settles, a black college football player who, his family claimed, was murdered by the police. In 1990, Cochran joined a succeeding firm, Cochran, Mitchell & Jenna, and joined Cochran, Cherry, Givens & Smith in 1997. The Cochran Firm has grown to have regional offices located in fifteen states.

In most of his cases Cochran represented plaintiffs in tort actions and opposed tort reform. Due to his success as a lawyer, Cochran could encourage settlement simply by his presence on a case. According to Rev. Jesse Jackson, a call to Johnnie Cochran made "corporations and violators shake."

Cochran's well-honed rhetoric and flamboyance in the courtroom has been described as theatrical. His practice as a lawyer earned him great wealth. With his earnings, he bought and drove cars such as a Jaguar and a Rolls-Royce. He owned homes in Los Angeles, two apartments in West Hollywood and a condo in Manhattan. In 2001, Cochran's accountant estimated that within five years he would be worth 25–50 million.

Clients 
Before the Simpson case, Cochran had achieved a reputation as a "go-to" lawyer for the rich, as well as a successful advocate for minorities in police brutality and civil rights cases. However, the controversial and dramatic Simpson trial made Cochran more widely known, generating a more polarized perception about him.

Cochran had often liked to say that he worked "not only for the OJs, but also the No Js". In other words, he enjoyed defending or suing in the name of those who did not have fame or wealth. Cochran believed that his "most glorious" moment as a lawyer occurred when he won the freedom of Geronimo Pratt. Cochran said he considered Pratt's release "the happiest day" of his legal practice. In the words of Harvard Law School professor Charles Ogletree, Cochran "was willing to fight for the underdog." Rev. Jesse Jackson believed Cochran was the "people's lawyer." Magic Johnson proclaimed Cochran was known "...for representing O. J. and Michael, but he was bigger and better than that".

O. J. Simpson 

During closing arguments in the Simpson trial, Cochran uttered the now famous phrase, "If it doesn't fit, you must acquit." He used the phrase, which had been devised by fellow defense team member Gerald Uelmen, as a way to try to persuade the jury that Simpson could not have murdered Nicole Brown Simpson nor Ron Goldman. In a dramatic scene, Simpson appeared to have difficulty getting the glove on; stained with blood of both victims and Simpson, it had been found at the crime scene.

Cochran did not represent Simpson in the subsequent civil trial and Simpson was found liable for the deaths. Cochran was criticized during the criminal trial by pundits, as well as by prosecutor Christopher Darden, for suggesting that the police were trying to frame Simpson because they were racist. During the trial, Cochran successfully convinced the jury that the prosecution did not prove Simpson was guilty beyond a reasonable doubt and that the police planted evidence against him.

Robert Shapiro, co-counsel on the Simpson defense team, accused Cochran of dealing the "race card" "from the bottom of the deck." In response, Cochran replied it was "not a case about race, it is a case about reasonable doubt...", noting "there are a lot of white people who are willing to accept this verdict."

Abner Louima 
Cochran successfully represented Abner Louima, a Haitian immigrant living in Brooklyn who was sodomized with a broken broomstick by officer Justin Volpe while in police custody. Louima was awarded an $8.75 million settlement, the largest police brutality settlement in New York City's history. Tension broke out between Louima's original lawyers and the new team headed by Cochran. The former team felt that Cochran and his colleagues were trying to take control of the entire trial.

Sean Combs 
In 2001, Sean (P. Diddy) Combs was indicted on bribery and stolen weapons charges. He hired Cochran for his defense. Cochran effectively fought for Combs' freedom, and Combs was acquitted.

In 2002, Cochran told Combs that this would be his last criminal case. Cochran retired after the trial. R. Kelly and Allen Iverson later asked for his services in criminal cases but he declined to represent them.

Stanley Tookie Williams 

Johnnie Cochran defended 17-year old Stanley Tookie Williams in a robbery trial in the early 1970s. Williams at the time was a known member of the Westside Crips street gang. After less than 10 minutes of deliberation, Williams was acquitted by a jury of all charges.

Years later, Williams was arrested for assaulting LAPD personnel and was acquitted with Cochran again serving as his counsel.

Cochran did not represent Williams at his multiple murder trials in the 1980s.

Michael Jackson 

Cochran also represented Michael Jackson when he was accused of child molestation in 1993. However, the case was settled out of court by Jackson and his accuser.

Illness and death 
In December 2003, Cochran was diagnosed with a brain tumor. In April 2004, he underwent surgery, which led him to stay away from the media. Shortly thereafter, he told the New York Post that he was feeling well and was in good health.

He died from the brain tumor on March 29, 2005, at his home in Los Angeles. Public viewing of his casket was conducted on April 4, at the Angelus Funeral Home and April 5, at Second Baptist Church, in Los Angeles. A memorial service was held at West Angeles Cathedral, in Los Angeles, on April 6, 2005. His remains were interred in the Inglewood Park Cemetery in Inglewood, California. The funeral was attended by his father Johnnie Sr. and numerous former friends and clients, including O. J. Simpson and Michael Jackson.

Posthumous ruling 
On May 31, 2005, two months after Cochran's death, the U.S. Supreme Court delivered its opinion in Tory v. Cochran. The court ruled 7–2 that in light of Cochran's death, an injunction limiting the demonstrations of Ulysses Tory "amounts to an overly broad prior restraint upon speech." Two justices, Antonin Scalia and Clarence Thomas, said that Cochran's death made it unnecessary for the court to rule. Lower courts, before Cochran died, held that Tory could not make any public comments about Cochran.

Legacy 

On January 24, 2006, Los Angeles Unified School District officials unanimously approved the renaming of Mount Vernon Middle School, Cochran's boyhood middle school, to Johnnie L Cochran Jr. Middle School in his honor. The decision received mixed responses.
In 2007, the three-block stretch of the street in front of the school was renamed "Johnnie Cochran Vista".
In 2007, Cedars-Sinai Medical Center in Los Angeles opened the new Johnnie L Cochran Jr. Brain Tumor Center, a research center headed by noted neurosurgeon Keith Black, who had been Cochran's doctor.
Cochran's family created an endowed chair, the Johnnie L Cochran Jr. Chair in Civil Rights, at his alma mater, Loyola Law School of Loyola Marymount University.
Cochran's footprints are featured on the Northwest Louisiana Walk of Stars in his hometown of Shreveport, Louisiana.

In popular culture 

After the Simpson trial, Cochran was a frequent commentator in law-related television shows. Additionally, he hosted his own show, Johnnie Cochran Tonight, on CourtTV. With the Simpson fame also came movie deals.

Actor Phil Morris played attorney Jackie Chiles, a character parody of Cochran, in several episodes of Seinfeld. He was satirized in the "Chef Aid" episode of the animated sitcom South Park, in which he appears using a confusing legal strategy called "the Chewbacca defense", a direct parody of his closing argument when defending O.J. Simpson. Cochran took these parodies in stride, discussing them in his autobiography, A Lawyer's Life. Additionally, he appeared as himself in The Hughleys, Family Matters, The Howard Stern Show, Arli$$, CHiPs '99, Bamboozled, Showtime, Martin, and JAG.

Ving Rhames played Cochran in the film American Tragedy (2000).

Cochran is mentioned in the 2011 musical comedy The Book of Mormon, where he is depicted as being in hell alongside Genghis Khan, Jeffrey Dahmer, and Adolf Hitler for "getting O. J. free".

Cochran was portrayed in The People v. O. J. Simpson: American Crime Story (2016) by actor Courtney B. Vance. Vance won the Primetime Emmy Award for Outstanding Lead Actor in a Limited Series or Movie for his performance.

On November 6, 1995, in season 3, episode 8, "The Party's Over" of The Nanny, the final joke is Cochran's line from O.J. Simpson's trial: "If it doesn't fit, you must acquit." To Fran's dismay, her elderly lawyer uncle refers to her skimpy skirt barely covering her buttocks, only to fall asleep in mid-session afterwards.

In 2002, Good Charlotte released a song, "Lifestyles of the Rich and Famous", in which a line makes reference to Cochran's defence of O.J. Simpson, saying: "Well, did you know, when you were famous, you could kill your wife? And there's no such thing as 25-to-life – as long as you've got the cash to pay for Cochran."

References

External links 

The Cochran Firm's website
The Cochran Firm California website
The Cochran Firm – Nashville website
The Cochran Firm's Washington, D.C. website
Johnny Cochran Death

1937 births
2005 deaths
African-American lawyers
American prosecutors
Burials at Inglewood Park Cemetery
California lawyers
Deaths from brain cancer in the United States
Criminal defense lawyers
Loyola Law School alumni
O. J. Simpson murder case
People from Los Angeles
People from Shreveport, Louisiana
University of California, Los Angeles alumni